The 1994 Women's Asian Games Basketball Tournament was held in Hiroshima from 3 to 13 October 1994.

Results
All times are Japan Standard Time (UTC+09:00)

Preliminary round

Final round

Bronze medal game

Gold medal game

Final standing

References
Results

External links
Basketball Results

women